Diriá is a district of the Santa Cruz canton, in the Guanacaste province of Costa Rica.

History 
Diriá was created on 3 September 1976 by Decreto Ejecutivo 6369-G. Segregated from Bolsón.

Geography 
Diriá has an area of  km² and an elevation of  metres.

Villages
Administrative center of the district is the village of Santa Bárbara.

Other villages in the district are Calle Vieja, Coyolar, Diría, Guaitil, Polvazal, Sequeira, Talolinguita and Trompillal.

Demographics 

For the 2011 census, Diriá had a population of  inhabitants.

Transportation

Road transportation 
The district is covered by the following road routes:
 National Route 21
 National Route 920
 National Route 931

References 

Districts of Guanacaste Province
Populated places in Guanacaste Province